The 2017 Men's Oceania Cup was the tenth edition of the men's field hockey tournament. It was held from 11 to 15 October in Sydney.

The tournament served as a qualifier for the 2018 FIH World Cup.

Australia won the tournament for the tenth time, defeating New Zealand 6–0 in the final.

Teams

Results
All times are local (AEDT).

Preliminary round

Pool

Fixtures

Classification

Final

Statistics

Final standings

Goalscorers

References

External links
International Hockey Federation

Oceania Cup
2017 in field hockey
2017 in Australian field hockey
International field hockey competitions hosted by Australia
October 2017 sports events in Australia
International sports competitions hosted at Sydney Olympic Park
Oceania Cup